Alfredo Silipigni (April 9, 1931 – March 25, 2006) was the creator of the New Jersey State Opera in the 1970s and remained there until his death in 2006. While with the opera company, Silipigni led opera productions throughout North America as lead conductor including Turandot and Caterina Cornaro.

Early life
Silipigni was born in Atlantic City and educated at the Juilliard School and Westminster Choir College of Rider University.

Career
For his opera career, Silipigni was part of the NBC Symphony Orchestra in the mid 1950s and played at Carnegie Hall. Silipigni started worked with the New Jersey State Opera when they opened in the 1960s. While with the opera company, Silipigni was a director and lead conductor. Silipigni was known for his talent conducting verismo opera. In 1973 he took the New Jersey State Opera to New York's Carnegie Hall where he conducted the United States' premiere of a long forgotten Donizetti opera, Catarina Cornaro. Silipigni conducted Puccini's Turandot for the NJSOpera's house debut at the New Jersey Performing Arts Center (Newark) in February and March 1998.

For the 1999 production of Giordano's Fedora in Mexico City, Silipigni worked with Placido Domingo. Other stars, including Metropolitan Opera singers Licia Albanese and Jerome Hines, often sang in his productions. In October 2002, Silipigni conducted two performances of Verdi's Aida in Shanghai with a cast of 1,500 and audiences of more than 50,000, according to the NJSOpera web site. He also brought in singers based in other parts of the world for rare American appearances. These included Turkish soprano Leyla Gencer, verismo Magda Olivero, and dramatic tenor Nicola Martinucci.

Death
Silipigni died on March 25 at the age of 74 in Livingston, New Jersey. His death was caused by complications of pneumonia.

References

External links
Opera News
News

American male conductors (music)
American people of Italian descent
1931 births
2006 deaths
Musicians from Atlantic City, New Jersey
People from West Orange, New Jersey
Juilliard School alumni
Music directors (opera)
Westminster Choir College alumni
Classical musicians from New Jersey
20th-century American conductors (music)
20th-century American male musicians
21st-century American conductors (music)
21st-century American male musicians
Deaths from pneumonia in New Jersey